The Power Within is a 1995 karate film directed by Art Camacho and written by Joe Hart and Scott McAboy.

Plot
Stan Dryer, a teenager with a green-belt in karate but little success in life, is given an ancient ring by an old karate master whom Stan tried to save from impending doom.

Stan soon discovers the magical power of the ring when he defeats five drunk, low-life idiots who want to steal his red convertible. He even discovers that the ring gives him the power to answer any question you may have about the rise and fall of Communism in Russia.

Soon Stan starts taking advantage of his power. One day, at lunch, Stan and his friend notice the top jock at school asking his girlfriend why they broke up. Stan and his friend overhear the conversation and Stan's friend says something along the lines of, "...it'd be nice if someone would shove his jockstrap in his face..."  Stan counters this by saying, "I think I can do better than that."

Stan then gets up and asks out the top jock's girlfriend. The top jock becomes furious and tries to punch Stan, but Stan grabs his fist in defense. A fight breaks out, and Stan ends up defeating 12 jocks in the process. Soon Stan meets up with an evil man named Vonn, and also meets a monkey that is actually a reincarnated version of the old man. Stan discovers his powers were in him the whole time and defeats Vonn, gets the girl and is happy.

Cast
 Ted Jan Roberts as Stan Dryer
 Karen Valentine as Clyda Dryer
 Keith Coogan as Eric Graves
 William Zabka as Raymond Vonn
 John O'Hurley as Lieutenant Cabrell
 Gerald Okamura as Yung
 Tracy Melchior as Sandy Applegate
 P.J. Soles as Mrs. Applegate
 Irwin Keyes as Mosh
 Jean Speegle Howard as Dr. Richman
 Karen Kim as Hin-See
 Ed O'Ross as Deriva
 Jacob Parker as Deke Dryer
 Marc Riffon as Rocky
 Francis Fallon as Leon
 Don "The Dragon" Wilson as himself

External links

1995 films
1990s action films
1995 martial arts films
American martial arts films
American action films
1990s English-language films
Films directed by Art Camacho
1990s American films